Casar de Palomero is a municipality located in the province of Cáceres, Extremadura, Spain. According to the 2005 census (INE), the municipality has a population of 1343 inhabitants.

Casar de Palomero is historically not part of Las Hurdes region. However, it eventually merged with the other municipalities of the comarca to form the Mancomunidad de Las Hurdes.

References

Municipalities in the Province of Cáceres
Las Hurdes